Centurion Glacier is a small steep glacier flowing northwest to Neny Bay between Mount Nemesis and Roman Four Promontory, on the west coast of Graham Land.

History
Centurion Glacier was first roughly surveyed in 1936 by the British Graham Land Expedition under Rymill, and resurveyed in 1947 by the Falkland Islands Dependencies Survey (FIDS). The name, given by FIDS, derives from association with Roman Four Promontory.

References
 

Glaciers of Fallières Coast